David Arthur Lafortune (October 4, 1848 – October 19, 1922) was a lawyer and political figure in Quebec. He represented Montcalm from 1909 to 1917 and Jacques Cartier from 1917 to 1922 in the House of Commons of Canada as a Liberal.

He was born in Saint-Ésprit, Canada East, the son of Joachim Lafortune and Félicité Beaupré, and was educated at the Collège de L'Assomption and the Université Laval. Lafortune was married twice: to Mary Hedwige Messier in 1874 and to Christina-Corinne Lussier in 1898. He was called to the Quebec bar in 1883. He ran unsuccessfully for a seat in the Quebec assembly in 1886 and 1904. Lafortune was appointed Crown Prosecutor for Montreal in 1905. In 1906, he was named King's Counsel. Lafortune was first elected to the House of Commons in a 1909 by-election held after François Octave Dugas was named a judge. He died in office in Montreal at the age of 74.

References

Members of the House of Commons of Canada from Quebec
Liberal Party of Canada MPs
1848 births
1922 deaths
Canadian King's Counsel